Seán Treacy (born 1965) is an Irish former hurler who played as a left wing-back for the Galway senior team.

Treacy made his first appearance for the team during the 1988–89 National Hurling League and quickly became a regular player over the next few seasons. During that time he won two National League winner's medals and two All-Star awards.

At club level Treacy enjoyed a lengthy career with Portumna, however, he ended his career without winning a county club championship winners' medal.

References

1965 births
Living people
Connacht inter-provincial hurlers
Galway inter-county hurlers
Portumna hurlers
People from Portumna